Grace Juliette Claxton Joseph (born August 19, 1993) is a Puerto Rican hurdler and sprinter who competes for Albany Great Danes. She represented Puerto Rico at the 2016 World Indoor Championships.

Competition record

1Out of competition performance

Personal bests
Outdoor
200 metres – 24.38 (-0.6 m/s, Ponce 2013)
400 metres – 53.42 (Ponce 2014)
400 metres hurdles – 55.85 (Rio de Janeiro 2016)
Indoor
400 metres – 52.89 (Boston 2016)

References

1993 births
Living people
Puerto Rican female sprinters
Pan American Games competitors for Puerto Rico
Sportspeople from San Juan, Puerto Rico
Athletes (track and field) at the 2015 Pan American Games
Athletes (track and field) at the 2019 Pan American Games
Albany Great Danes women's track and field athletes
Athletes (track and field) at the 2016 Summer Olympics
Olympic track and field athletes of Puerto Rico
Competitors at the 2018 Central American and Caribbean Games